is a Japanese footballer currently playing as a defender for Vanraure Hachinohe.

Career statistics

Club
.

Notes

References

External links

1996 births
Living people
Japanese footballers
Association football defenders
Komazawa University alumni
Japan Football League players
J3 League players
Honda Lock SC players
Vanraure Hachinohe players